Small Town Boy is the debut studio album by Dutch singer Duncan Laurence. It was released on 13 November 2020 by Spark Records. The album includes the singles "Arcade", "Love Don't Hate It", "Someone Else", "Last Night" and "Feel Something". A deluxe edition of the album was released on 21 May 2021, containing three additional tracks: "Stars", "Sad Old Me" and "I Got You".

Background
He wrote the album with the help of his boyfriend Jordan Garfield. He said, "We really got to know each other way better through writing music too because you share stories together in a whole different way and you go really deep into those stories and maybe sometimes you get to express emotions that you wouldn't normally express if it's not in writing a song." He also produced a lot of songs on the album and will direct many of his upcoming music videos. By being involved in the process of both, he believed "that he would be able to merge the two creative worlds together more seamlessly". He said, "It is a good way to not only express yourself via music but also via visuals because they go so well with each other."

Singles
"Arcade" was released as the lead single from the album on 7 March 2019. The song peaked at number one on the Dutch Singles Chart. The song represented the Netherlands at the Eurovision Song Contest 2019, in which it won. "Love Don't Hate It" was released as the second single from the album on 23 October 2019. The song peaked at number forty-one on the Dutch Singles Chart. "Someone Else" was released as the third single from the album on 13 May 2020. The song peaked at number seventy-two on the Dutch Singles Chart. "Last Night" was released as the fourth single from the album on 1 October 2020. "Feel Something" was released as the fifth single from the album on 6 November 2020. The song peaked at number eighty-five on the Dutch Singles Chart.

Track listing

Personnel 
Credits adapted from the album's liner notes.

 Rens Dekker – artwork
 Duncan Laurence – liner notes 
 Elise Hama – grooming
 Anouk van Griensven – styling
 Paul Bellaart – photography

Charts

Certifications

Release history

References

2020 debut albums
Duncan Laurence albums